James Kenan (1740–1810) was an American military officer and politician who served as a brigadier general of the Wilmington District Brigade during the American Revolutionary War and commander of the North Carolina militia after the war. He was active in North Carolina politics and served ten terms as a state senator.

Pre and during war
James Kenan was born on September 23, 1740 at the family plantation, The Lilacs, in Turkey, Sampson County, North Carolina.  His parents were Thomas Kenan, born in Ireland, and Elizabeth (Johnston) Kenan.

James Kenan was elected Sheriff of Duplin County, North Carolina at age 22. While serving as Stamp Master of North Carolina he led a company of volunteers to Wilmington to oppose the Stamp Act. He also served as Chairman of the Duplin and Wilmington Committee of Safety.

From 1775 to 1783, he served as Colonel over the Duplin County Regiment of the North Carolina militia.   In 1781, he was appointed brigadier general (pro tempore) of the Wilmington District Brigade of the North Carolina militia.

Post war
Kenan served as a member of the state constitutional convention in 1788 and 1789. Kenan also served as chairman on Ratification of the United States Constitution in the Fayetteville Convention and one of the first trustees of the University of North Carolina. By the time he died he had served ten terms (17771783) as a senator in the North Carolina Senate. He was also appointed as a brigadier general over the North Carolina militia after the Revolutionary War.  He belonged to the Masonic Fraternity and was worshipful master of St. John's Lodge No.13 of Duplin County.

Family
Kenan married Sarah Love "Sallie" March 13, 1770 and produced eight children, including his son Thomas S. Kenan.  Thomas Kenan served in the North Carolina legislature and three terms as North Carolina representative in the U.S. Congress. Five members of his family would later become sheriff of Duplin County.

Death and honors

James Kenan died on May 23, 1810 in Turkey, Sampson County, North Carolina.  He was originally buried at his plantation in Turkey, North Carolina.  However, he was later reinterred at Liberty Hall in Kenansville, North Carolina.

Historical marker F-26 was erected in his honor on North Carolina highway 24 about three miles west of Warsaw.  In November 2007, he was inducted into the Duplin County Hall of Fame.

In 1818 the new county seat of Duplin was named "Kenansville" in his honor. James Kenan High School located in Warsaw, North Carolina was named after him in 1958.

References

1740 births
1810 deaths
North Carolina militiamen in the American Revolution
North Carolina state senators
North Carolina sheriffs
James
People from Duplin County, North Carolina
18th-century American politicians
19th-century American politicians
Militia generals in the American Revolution
Members of the North Carolina Provincial Congresses